The 2002 Adidas International was a combined men's and women's tennis tournament played on outdoor hard courts at the NSW Tennis Centre in Sydney in Australia that was part of the International Series of the 2002 ATP Tour and of Tier II of the 2002 WTA Tour. The tournament ran from 6 through 13 January 2002. Roger Federer and Martina Hingis won the singles titles.

Finals

Men's singles

 Roger Federer defeated  Juan Ignacio Chela 6–3, 6–3
 It was Federer's 1st title of the year and the 2nd of his career.

Women's singles

 Martina Hingis defeated  Meghann Shaughnessy 6–2, 6–3
 It was Hingis' 1st title of the year and the 73rd of her career.

Men's doubles

 Donald Johnson /  Jared Palmer defeated  Joshua Eagle /  Sandon Stolle 6–4, 6–4
 It was Johnson's 2nd title of the year and the 23rd of his career. It was Palmer's 2nd title of the year and the 25th of his career.

Women's doubles

 Lisa Raymond /  Rennae Stubbs defeated  Martina Hingis /  Anna Kournikova by walkover
 It was Raymond's 1st title of the year and the 32nd of her career. It was Stubbs' 1st title of the year and the 34th of her career.

External links
 Official website
 ATP tournament profile
 WTA tournament profile

 
Adidas International, 2002